Lectionary 7, designated by siglum ℓ 7 (in the Gregory-Aland numbering). It is a Greek manuscript of the New Testament, on vellum leaves. It is dated by a colophon to the year 1204.

Description 

The codex contains Lessons from the Gospels lectionary (Evangelistarium) with lacunae. It is written in Greek minuscule letters, on 316 parchment leaves, 2 columns per page, 23 lines per page. It contains music notes.

History 

The manuscript was written by priest Georg Rhodiu (from Rhodos?).

The manuscript once belonged to Colbert, as lectionaries ℓ 8, ℓ 9, ℓ 10, ℓ 11, ℓ 12. It was examined and described by Montfaucon, Wettstein, Scholz, and Paulin Martin. It was added to the list of the New Testament manuscripts by Wettstein.
Gregory saw the manuscript in 1885.

The text was edited by Henri Omont.

The manuscript is sporadically cited in the critical editions of the Greek New Testament of UBS (UBS3).

The codex now is located in the Bibliothèque Nationale de France (Gr. 301) at Paris.

See also 

 List of New Testament lectionaries
 Biblical manuscript
 Textual criticism

References

Bibliography 

 Henri Omont, Fac-similés des plus anciens mss. grecs de la Bibliothèque Nationale du IVe et XIII siècle, (Paris, 1892), p. 18. 

Greek New Testament lectionaries
13th-century biblical manuscripts
Bibliothèque nationale de France collections